The 2001 Winter European Youth Olympic Winter Festival was an international multi-sport event held between 11 and 15 March 2001, in Vuokatti, Finland.

Sports

Medalists

Alpine skiing

Biathlon

Cross-country skiing

Ice hockey

Ski jumping

Snowboarding

Speed skating

Medal table

External links
 Results

European Youth Olympic Winter Festival
European Youth Olympic Winter Festival
European Youth Olympic Winter Festival
European Youth Olympic Winter Festival
International sports competitions hosted by Finland
Youth sport in Finland
Sports festivals in Finland
European Youth Olympic Winter Festival
European Youth Olympic Winter Festival
Sotkamo